The Sikka language or Sikkanese, also known as Sika, is spoken by around 180,000 people of the Sika ethnic group on Flores island in East Nusa Tenggara province, Indonesia. It is a member of the Central Malayo-Polynesian branch of the Austronesian language family. 

Sikka is notable for being one of the few languages which contain a non-allophonic labiodental flap. Like many other languages in eastern Indonesia, it shows evidence of having a Papuan (non-Austronesian) substratum, but in the case of Sika, this includes extreme morphological simplification and about 20% lexical replacement in basic vocabulary. It has been hypothesized that the Austronesian languages in that area could be descendants of a creole language, resulting from the intrusion of Austronesian languages into eastern Indonesia.

Sika has at least three recognized dialects:
 Sikka Natar, which is generally perceived in the region to be the most refined and most prestigious of the Sika speech varieties.
 Sara Krowe, spoken in the central hills of Sika-speaking people.
 Ata Tana 'Ai or Sara Tana 'Ai, used by both outsiders and insiders to refer to the people and language of the region; it is also used as a ritual language.

Phonology

Consonants
Sika has the following consonant phonemes:

Vowels 
Sika has the following vowel phonemes:

References

Flores-Lembata languages
Languages of Indonesia